The Monkey Puzzle is the fourth album by the Australian music group The Saints released in January 1981. It was the first album to be released after Ed Kuepper left the band.

Reception
Roadrunner said, "As an LP, The Monkey Puzzle would have made a fantastic EP. The glory of the four standout tracks is matched only by the mediocrity of everything else on the album. Playing standard and sound quality are so inconsistent that the record as a whole is vaguely annoying."

Track listing
 All tracks C.J. Bailey copyright Lost Music\Mushroom Music
except "Dizzy Miss Lizzy" by Larry Williams

"Miss Wonderful" - 3:33
"Always, Always" - 3:50
"Paradise" - 3:44
"Let's Pretend" - 3:27
"Somebody" - 3:55
"Monkeys" - 4:38
"Mystery Dream" - 3:51
"In the Mirror" - 3:48
"Simple Love" - 4:20
"The Ballad" - 4:25
"Dizzy Miss Lizzy" - 3:29

Charts

Personnel
The Saints
Chris Bailey - vocals
Barrington Francis - guitar
Janine Hall - bass
Mark Birmingham - drums
with:
Ivor Hay - keyboards
Patrick Mathé - harmonica
The Pig and Monkey Choir - backing vocals

Production

Gerry Nixon - engineer, mix engineer, producer
Chris Bailey - producer

References

The Saints (Australian band) albums
1981 albums